Syndicate Music Production was founded in 1993 by the German producer and songwriter Achim Kleist (a.k.a. Frank Lio).
In 1998, he was joined by partner Wolfgang von Webenau (a.k.a. D. Fact). 
The company's headquarters and studios are located near Munich (Germany), where productions and compositions for pop, rock, film and advertising are produced.
Syndicate Musicproduction's biggest success was with the single "Mambo No.5" by Lou Bega and the follow-up album "A Little Bit Of Mambo". It went on to sell more than 20 million copies.

Success Story  

Syndicate Music has received over 60 gold and platinum awards for its various productions and has had more than 70 Top 10 hits in the international charts.
Achim Kleist and Wolfgang von Webenau were both nominated for the German Echo Award in 2000 as best producers. 
Their roster of artists were honoured with awards such as the Latin Music Award, the World Music Award and the Echo, as well as a Grammy nomination for Lou Bega.

Artists 
The Syndicate team has written and produced e.g. for following artists:
 Lou Bega
 Worlds Apart
 DJ Bobo
 DJ Ötzi
 Right Said Fred
 Compay Segundo from the Buena Vista Social Club

Film Music 
Their work can be found in the following films:
 Madagascar (DreamWorks)
 Stuart Little (Sony Pictures)
 Just Visiting (Buena Vista)

or in TV series such as:
 Ally McBeal
 Lizzie McGuire
 The Simpsons
 The Office (U.S. TV series)

External links 
 Syndicate Music production Website
 Swiss Charts (Frank Lio)
 Swiss Charts (Achim Kleist)
 Lou Bega (last.fm auf Spiegel.Online)
 [ Lou Bega (Billboard Charts)]
 Echo (Nominierte 2000)
 Grammy (Nominierte 2000)
 Discography at Discogs (Frank Lio)

Record production duos
Songwriting teams
German record producers